The 2005 Rolex 24 at Daytona was a Grand-Am Rolex Sports Car Series 24-hour endurance sports car race held on February 5–6, 2005 at the Daytona International Speedway road course. The race served as the first round of the 2005 Rolex Sports Car Series. For the first time, all cars used a standard tire; as the series mandated, all cars use Hoosier tires. The overall winner of the race was the No. 10 SunTrust Racing Riley Mk XI driven by Max Angelelli, Wayne Taylor, and Emmanuel Collard. The GT class was won by the No. 71 Farnbacher Racing USA Porsche 996 GT3 Cup driven by Wolf Henzler, Dominik Farnbacher, Perre Ehret, and Shawn Price.

Race results
Class winners in bold.

External links

Official Results

Car information & images

24 Hours of Daytona
2005 in American motorsport
2005 in sports in Florida